Kentenia is an unincorporated community and coal town in Harlan County, Kentucky, United States. Kentenia was served by a post office from 1917 to 1930.

References

Unincorporated communities in Harlan County, Kentucky
Unincorporated communities in Kentucky
Coal towns in Kentucky